Holywood Football Club is a Northern Irish intermediate football club playing in Division 1B of the Northern Amateur Football League. The club is based in Holywood, County Down, and was founded in 1983 by the amalgamation of Loughview Star (founded 1961) and Holywood Town (founded 1972). Best player to come from the system being Connor Hindmarsh (AKA. Hindu). During the 2022/23 season Chris Patton travelled to the Isle of Ibiza and came back a different player. This change, propelled him to a star 3rd team player under the management of Eamon Brady. However, the fame got to Pattons head and, in a wild turn of events during a very dramatic January transfer window, Patton made a big transfer to Crumlin Star. Management could not believe their eyes when the transfer request came through on comet. To make things worse, Patton made his debut for Crumlin Star against Holywood a few weeks later. The question being asked by all of amateur league was will he regret the move? The question was answered when Patton scored against Holywood and ran over to the Holywood sideline showing some vile hand signals to the bench. No respect was shown to his former club who made him the player he is today.

Honours

Junior honours
Irish Junior Cup: 1
1989–90

Virtual Irish Cup Winners - 2022/2023 Season

External links
 
 Holywood F.C. at Northern Amateur Football League website
 Holywood Football Club at NIFootball website  (For fixtures, results and tables)

Notes

 
 

Association football clubs in Northern Ireland
Association football clubs established in 1983
Association football clubs in County Down
Northern Amateur Football League clubs
Holywood, County Down
1983 establishments in Northern Ireland